John Duff, born John McElduff,  or John Michael McElduff, because early court records referred to him as John Michael Duff (September 1759 or August 1760 – June 4, 1799 or 1805), was a counterfeiter, criminal gang leader, horse thief, cattle thief, hog thief, salt maker, longhunter, scout, and soldier who assisted in George Rogers Clark's campaign to capture the Illinois country for the American rebel side during the Revolutionary War.

Early life and family history
John Michael McElduff was born sometime between September 1759 and August 1760 in the British Province of South Carolina, according to his court testimony in August 1781, where he claimed to be 21 years old. John's father may have been the Thomas McElduff murdered by Philip McElduff, a brother, of Thomas, some time prior to November 1761.  His mother later remarried, and his stepfather moved the family to the Natchez District, Mississippi region of the colony of British West Florida, on the Mississippi River, prior to the start of the American Revolutionary War.  McElduff is believed to be a grandson of a Thomas McElduff, Sr., who received two land grants for military service in the French and Indian War on the south side of the Tyger River, in Union County, South Carolina on February 7, 1754.

American Revolutionary War service and life in the Illinois Country

Around 1778, Duff was living in the Illinois Country, later referred to as the "American Bottom." While leading a group of longhunters returning to Kaskaskia, John Duff, John Saunders, and the rest of the hunting party were intercepted by Colonel George Rogers Clark's soldiers and his Virginia frontiersmen soldiers, near the ruins of Fort Massac.  Suspected of being British spies, they immediately took an American oath of allegiance, where Duff and his men joined Clark's Illinois Regiment, Virginia State Forces. Duff enlisted into Captain John Williams' Company in Cahokia and rose to the rank of sergeant in the Illinois Regiment.  

In 1780, while Duff was posted with the garrison in Cahokia, a British force attacked St. Louis, which was under colonial Spanish rule, and American-held Cahokia in 1780, with a motley army of British Loyalists composed of French-Canadiens, fur traders, and their Indian allies.  McElduff and other soldiers were on reconnaissance, for General Clark, observing the British movements, near the Mississippi River. The group was attacked by an Indian war party, barely escaping with their lives.  The combined American, French, and Spanish forces successfully repelled the enemy assaults.  In the George Rogers Clark Papers and Illinois court records, Duff was referred to both as "John McElduff" and "John McDuff."

In the mid-late 1780s, Duff was living in Kaskaskia, Illinois and was in business with two brothers of the captain of the Ohio County, Virginia Militia and Revolutionary War Patriot,  Samuel Mason who later became the notorious river pirate.  According to the French Kaskaskia records, the Duff name was recorded as, "Jean Michel Duff" and "John Michael Duff."  In 1786, John, Daniel, and another son of Thomas McElduff sold land tracts for two different property deeds.  There was a Daniel McElduff and McDuff who was also at Kaskaskia in the 1780s and was likely the brother of John Duff.  When the McElduffs first arrived, the pre-American Revolution, British-controlled, French-speaking settlement of Kaskaskia was not recorded.  Daniel McDuff owned slaves while residing in Kaskaskia, as was the custom of transplanted Southerners and the French creole population in the Illinois Country. After the departure of the bandit John Dodge, who lived in the area from 1784 to 1790, John McElduff was elected, in 1790, as one of six judges, to the Kaskaskia town court.  According to the French records, on February 6, 1794, John McElduff and Seddy, his wife, sold a dwelling and grounds in Kaskaskia Village, to J.R. Jones for $200; this Jones may have been John Rice Jones, a politician and Illinois Regiment veteran.

Counterfeiting at Cave-In-Rock, Northwest Territory and in Kentucky
After 1790, John Duff was associated with the South Carolina counterfeiter, Philip Alston, the Virginia river pirate, Samuel Mason, and the North Carolina serial killers the Harpe brothers, at Cave-in-Rock, in the U.S. Northwest Territory, where he learned the illicit business of counterfeiting, known as "coining", where he could make a lot money in criminal pursuits.  By this time, he had left the historical record and from this point on, he was referred to in folklore as, just Duff or "Duff the Counterfeiter."  Even as a counterfeiter, John Duff was not a violent man by nature and he was never known to have killed anyone.  Whether or not John McElduff and his wife left Kaskaskia permanently after 1794 is not known, but folklore mentioned John Duff, as owning a slave named Pompey and tales of his miraculously avoiding numerous attempts at capture and death from local regulator vigilantes and the U.S. Army.

Death
For nearly a decade, Duff had become a scourge along the lower Ohio River region.  On June 4, 1799, a group of three Shawnee Indians and a French courier du bois were hired by U.S. Army officer, Captain Zebulon Pike, Sr., father of the explorer Zebulon Pike, who was the commandant at the frontier outpost Fort Massac, now Metropolis, Illinois. This mercenary party was given orders to kill John Duff, which they did at his house, which was located either at Battery Rock, according to the newspaper account, on the Illinois side of the Ohio River or across the river at what would later become Caseyville, Kentucky on the Tradewater River as, recalled in the History of Union County, Kentucky. According to Revolutionary Soldiers Buried in Illinois, Duff was killed in 1805 on Ripple Island, on the Saline River, in Gallatin County, Illinois and buried near the local salt springs.

See also
Peter Alston
Edward Bonney
Abel Buell
Mary Butterworth
Sile Doty
David Farnsworth
James Ford
Catherine Murphy
John Murrell
Sturdivant Gang
Samuel C. Upham

References
Alvord, Clarence Walworth. The Illinois Country, 1673-1818, Volume 1.  Springfield, Ill.:  Illinois Centennial Commission, 1920.
Alvord, Clarence Walworth, editor.  Kaskaskia Records, 1778-1790, Collections of the Illinois State Historical Library, Illinois State Historical Library.  Springfield, Ill.:  Trustees of the Illinois State Historical Library, 1909.
Bateman, Newton  and Paul Selby, editors.  Biographical and Memorial Edition of the Historical Encyclopedia of Illinois, Volume 1.  Munsell Publishing Company, 1915.  
Glaser, Lynn.  Counterfeiting in America: the history of an American way to wealth. C.N. Potter, 1968.
Reynolds, Governor John. Reynolds' History of Illinois: My Own Times: Embracing Also the History of My Life.  Chicago, IL:  Chicago Historical Society, 1879.
Reynolds, Governor John.  The Pioneer History of Illinois: Containing the Discovery, in 1673, and the History of the Country to the Year 1818, when the State Government was Organized.  Chicago, IL:  Fergus Print Company, 1887.
Rothert, Otto A. The Outlaws of Cave-In-Rock.  Cleveland:  1924; rpt. 1996 
Seineke, Kathrine Wagner Seineke. The George Rogers Clark adventure in the Illinois: and selected documents of the American Revolution at the frontier posts.  New York:  Polyanthos, 1981. 
Underwood, Lt. Thomas T.  "The journal, 1792-1800, of Thomas T. Underwood, lieutenant in the United States Army, life at Fort Massac (Illinois) under Zebulon M. Pike's command (1795-1798)," Draper Manuscripts: Frontier Wars Papers, 1754-1885 (Volume 16).  Wisconsin Historical Society, Library-Archives Division.
Walker, Mrs. Harriett J.  Revolutionary Soldiers Buried in Illinois. Standard Printing Company, 1918.
Wellman, Paul I. Spawn of evil: the invisible empire of soulless men which for a generation held the Nation in a spell of terror. New York: Doubleday, 1964.
Willson, Richard Eugene, Indexing, Donald E. Gradeless, Ph.D., Editor. 1998. Index to the George Rogers Clark Papers: The Illinois Regiment. Based on the Microfilmed George Rogers Clark Papers at the Virginia State Library and Archives. Chicago: Society of Colonial Wars in the State of Illinois. Chester Co (South Carolina) Misc Record Book LL, reprieve granted Philip McElduff convicted of murder of Thomas McElduff till Wed the 2nd of Dec 1761, p.417History of Union County, Kentucky. Chicago: Goodspeed Publishing Co., 1886.
New Bern District (North Carolina) Court Records 1770-1774. 
Papers of the U.S. War Department 1784-1800. 
Raymond H. Hammes Collection. English Summaries. Illinois State Archives. 81:2:27:1.
"Some Irish Protestant Immigrants to South Carolina 1753 and 1754," The South Carolina Magazine of Ancestral Research'', Vol. 17, No. 1 (Winter 1989):25-29. FHL Book 975.7 B2sc v.

External links
Sturdivant Gang and Ford's Ferry Gang Rogue's Gallery (with mention of John Duff criminal associates)

18th-century births
2nd-millennium deaths
American outlaws
18th-century American criminals
American counterfeiters
People murdered in Kentucky
Extrajudicial killings
American hunters
American slave owners
Illinois in the American Revolution
People from South Carolina
People from Natchez, Mississippi
People of pre-statehood Illinois
People from Kaskaskia, Illinois
People from Hardin County, Illinois
People from Saline County, Illinois